Brazo de Mercedes is a traditional Filipino meringue roll with a custard filling typically dusted with powdered sugar. It is a type of pianono.

Origins
Although popularly simply translated as "Mercedes' Arm", it actually means "Arm of Our Lady of Mercy" in Spanish, from Nuestra Señora de las Mercedes, a common devotional title for Mary, mother of Jesus. The dessert dates back to the Spanish colonial period. It is one of the desserts believed to have been the result of the repurposing of the discarded egg yolks from the use of egg whites for mortar and plaster in Spanish-Filipino colonial architecture.

Description
Unlike other types of Filipino pianonos which are made with rolled chiffon or sponge cakes, brazo de Mercedes is made from meringue and thus does not use flour. The meringue is made from egg whites, cream of tartar, and granulated sugar. The filling is traditionally custard made from egg yolks, sugar, and milk cooked in low heat in a double boiler. Other ingredients like calamansi zest, butter, and vanilla extract can also be added to the custard. Once the meringue is baked, the custard is spread evenly on one surface then it is carefully rolled into a cylinder. It is usually chilled and dusted with powdered sugar before being served.

Variants
Modern versions of the dessert can have a variety of different fillings and ingredients. These variations usually have different names, like brazo de ube, brazo de pandan, brazo de buko pandan, brazo de tsokolate, brazo de mangga, and so on.

See also

 Yema cake
 Ube cake
 Crema de Fruta

References

Philippine desserts
Cakes
Custard desserts
Meringue desserts